Nalenik Temela (1939–May 7, 2003) was an Inuit sculptor from Kimmirut.

Career 
Temela carved using soapstone and serpentine.

His work is held in several museums worldwide, including the Penn Museum, the Fine Arts Museums of San Francisco, the University of Michigan Museum of Art, the Musée national des beaux-arts du Québec, the Museum of Civilization in Ottawa, the Nunatta Sunakkutaangit Museum in Iqaluit, the National Museum of Ethnology in Osaka, and the Agnes Etherington Art Centre.

The North West Company gave Prince Charles and Princess Diana one of Temela's carvings as a wedding gift in 1982.

His work was part of the traveling 2005 exhibition "Masters of the Arctic."

Later life 
Temela died of cancer at age 64. He was survived by his wife, Itee, and their six children.

References 

1939 births
2003 deaths
People from Kimmirut
20th-century Canadian sculptors
Inuit sculptors
Inuit from Nunavut
Artists from Nunavut
Canadian male sculptors
Deaths from cancer in Canada
20th-century Canadian male artists